Pavel Kovachev (born 27 July 1987 in Stara Zagora) is a Bulgarian footballer who plays for Lokomotiv Plovdiv as a defender.

Career
Kovachev started his career in his hometown in the youth teams of Beroe Stara Zagora. In 2007, he was sold to the Lithuanian side FBK Kaunas. 

After a year there, he returned to Bulgaria after he caught the eye of the CSKA Sofia scouts and signed with "The Armymen". He made his debut with CSKA in the last game of the 2008–09 season in the Bulgarian "A" Professional Football Group, which was a match against Lokomotiv Mezdra. CSKA Sofia won the game by a score of 2:1. 

In June 2009 Kovachev returned to his first club, signing a contract for two years.

Honours

Club
 Beroe
Bulgarian Cup:
Winner: 2009-10

References
 Profile at sportal.bg

1987 births
Living people
Bulgarian footballers
First Professional Football League (Bulgaria) players
PFC CSKA Sofia players
PFC Beroe Stara Zagora players
PFC Kaliakra Kavarna players
PFC Lokomotiv Plovdiv players
Association football defenders
Bulgarian expatriates in Lithuania
Sportspeople from Stara Zagora